John Shene (January 17, 1901 – January 1968) was an American bobsledder who competed in the 1930s. He finished fourth in the four-man event at the 1936 Winter Olympics in Garmisch-Partenkirchen.

References
1936 bobsleigh four-man results
1936 Olympic Winter Games official report.  - p. 414.

1901 births
1968 deaths
American male bobsledders
Olympic bobsledders of the United States
Bobsledders at the 1936 Winter Olympics